Liu Hesheng (born January 1962) is a former Chinese politician who served as mayor and party secretary of Yueyang from 2015 to 2019, and chairman of Yueyang People's Congress from 2018 to 2019. He was investigated by China's top anti-graft agency in April 2020.

Biography
Liu was born in Qidong County, Hunan, in January 1962. After resuming the college entrance examination, in 1978, he enrolled in Hengyang Branch of Hunan Agricultural College (now Hunan Polytechnic of Environment and Biology). He also studied at Xiangtan University, Central Party School and the University of Baltimore as a part-time student.

After graduating in 1981, he was despatched to Qidong County Bureau of Agriculture as an official. He joined the Chinese Communist Party (CCP) in November 1984. In January 1988, he was transferred to the capital Changsha and assigned to the Organization Department of CCP Hunan Provincial Committee. In October 2000, he was reassigned to You County, a county under the jurisdiction of Zhuzhou, where he was appointed party secretary, the top political position in the county. One year later, he was recalled to Changsha and became vice president of Hunan Federation of Trade Unions. In June 2006, he was transferred to central Loudi city and admitted to member of the standing committee of the CCP Loudi Municipal Committee, the city's top authority. In September, he was made secretary of its Commission for Discipline Inspection, the party's agency in charge of anti-corruption efforts. In June 2010, he rose to become executive vice mayor. In May 2013, he was appointed deputy party secretary of Chenzhou, he remained in that position until June 2015, when he was transferred to Yueyang and named acting mayor of the city. He was installed as mayor the next month. He moved up the ranks to become party secretary in February 2018 and chairman of Yueyang People's Congress in April of that same year. In January 2020, he took office of vice chairperson of the Hunan People's Congress Social Development Affairs Committee, but having held the position for only three months, while he was put under investigation for alleged "serious violations of discipline and laws".

Downfall
On 21 April 2020, he has been placed under investigation for "serious violations of discipline and laws" by the Central Commission for Discipline Inspection (CCDI), the party's internal disciplinary body, and the National Supervisory Commission, the highest anti-corruption agency of China. On August 11, his qualification for delegates to the 13th Hunan Congress was terminated. He was detained by the Hunan Provincial People's Procuratorate on October 26. On December 20, he was indicted on suspicion of accepting bribes.

On 14 July 2021, he was expelled from the Communist Party and dismissed from public office.

References

1962 births
Living people
People from Qidong County
Xiangtan University alumni
Central Party School of the Chinese Communist Party alumni
Mayors of Yueyang
People's Republic of China politicians from Hunan
Chinese Communist Party politicians from Hunan